art press is a monthly international review of contemporary art. Its first issue was for December 1972–January 1973. The original branding, which has hardly changed since, was by Roger Tallon. Articles are in French and English.

History
In her first editorial, Catherine Millet (co-founder with the art dealer Daniel Templon, and editor-in-chief) explained why she refused a journalistic approach, too much relying on anecdote; that she no more wanted an avant-garde review that erased art history than she wanted a review on the history of art longing for antiques. Finally, she said, she wanted break the xenophobic habits of French culture.

In her autobiographical novel,  ("The sex-life of Catherine M."), Millet explains that setting up the review, and the acquisition of its independent capital, was largely tied to its individual constitution, and she also noted the spirit of free enterprise.

Thirty years later, art press is one of the few influential journals in the French contemporary art market; it can promote, for example, an artist's standing. art press also gives its opinion, supported by references, on wider debates in society.

art press 2
In May 2006, art press 2 was first published. It was a new collection of three-monthly bilingual themed issues, commenting on news events. Issues of art press 2 have had the themes:  ("The French scene"),  ("Berlin, transit city"),  ("Cynicism and contemporary art"),  ("The new realists"),  ("A choice issue"),  ("London, new sensations"),  ("Performance today").

artpress.com
Designed and produced by the editorial team of the art press review, artpress.com is the updated Internet version of the magazine, with a selection of articles, interviews and reports, enriched by unedited content and longer editorials that are not in the paper review.

External links
  Official website

1972 establishments in France
French art publications
Contemporary art magazines
French-language magazines
Independent magazines
Magazines established in 1972
Magazines published in Paris
Monthly magazines published in France